The 2002 Patriot League men's basketball tournament was played at The Show Place Arena in Upper Marlboro, Maryland and Bender Arena in Washington, D.C. after the conclusion of the 2001–02 regular season. Number two seed  defeated top seed , 58–54 in the championship game, to win its third Patriot League Tournament title. The Crusaders earned an automatic bid to the 2002 NCAA tournament as #16 seed in the Midwest region.

Format
All eight league members participated in the tournament, with teams seeded according to regular season conference record.

Bracket

References

Tournament
Patriot League men's basketball tournament
Patriot League men's basketball tournament
Patriot League men's basketball tournament
Patriot League men's basketball tournament